High School DxD is an anime series adapted from the light novels of the same title written by Ichiei Ishibumi and illustrated by Miyama-Zero. Produced by TNK, directed by Tetsuya Yanagisawa, and written by Takao Yoshioka, the anime aired on TV Tokyo's satellite channel AT-X from January 6 to March 23, 2012. Set during the struggle among the devils, fallen angels, and angels, the story follows the adventures of Issei Hyodo. Issei is a perverted high school student who is nearly killed by his first date, who is revealed to be a fallen angel. He is revived by Rias Gremory, who is a crimson-haired school beauty that is actually a devil, and becomes her servant. The first season adapts material from the first two volumes of the light novels and a few side stories from Volume 8.

Six DVD and Blu-ray compilation volumes of the first season were released by Media Factory between March 21, 2012 and August 29, 2012. Each contained an OVA short entitled  and other bonus material. An OVA episode that is listed as episode 13 was released with the limited edition of the 13th light novel volume on September 6, 2012 on Blu-ray. The script was handled by Ichiei Ishibumi, who is the author of the light novels. Another OVA episode that is listed as episode 14 is written by Ishibumi and was bundled with the limited edition release of the 15th light novel volume on May 31, 2013 on Blu-ray.

In North America, the anime series is licensed by Funimation for simulcast on their website and home video releases on DVD and Blu-ray. In Australia, the series is licensed by Madman Entertainment, but it was not released in New Zealand after the Office of Film and Literature Classification (OFLC) decided against releasing it because "it encourages and legitimizes the pursuit of young persons as viable adult sexual partners". Funimation released the first season on August 20, 2013.

The original score for the series was composed by Ryosuke Nakanishi. The opening theme for the first season is titled "Trip -Innocent of D-" and performed by J-pop group Larval Stage Planning. The ending theme is titled "STUDYxSTUDY" and performed by the voice actress unit StylipS, which consists of Arisa Noto, Yui Ogura, Kaori Ishihara, and Maho Matsunaga.


Episode list

References

External links
  
  at FUNimation
 

High School DxD episode lists
2012 Japanese television seasons